The Aréthuse was a 40-gun frigate of the French Navy.

Started as Aréthuse, she was renamed to Elbe while still under construction. She was launched on 23 May 1808 and commissioned under captain Charles Berrenger.

At the Bourbon Restoration, she was renamed to Calypso, back to Elbe during the Hundred Days, and to Calypso after the final demise of Napoléon.

She was struck in 1825.

Sources and references 
 Les bâtiments ayant porté le nom d'Aréthuse, netmarine.net

Age of Sail frigates of France
Ships built in France
1808 ships